LAMF may refer to:
 L.A.M.F., the only album by The Heartbreakers
 Los Angeles Media Fund, an American independent entertainment company